The arrondissement of Tarbes is an arrondissement of France in the Hautes-Pyrénées department in the Occitanie region. It has 212 communes.

Composition

The communes of the arrondissement of Tarbes, and their INSEE codes, are:

 Allier (65005)
 Andrest (65007)
 Angos (65010)
 Ansost (65013)
 Antin (65015)
 Arcizac-Adour (65019)
 Aries-Espénan (65026)
 Artagnan (65035)
 Aubarède (65044)
 Aureilhan (65047)
 Aurensan (65048)
 Auriébat (65049)
 Averan (65052)
 Azereix (65057)
 Barbachen (65061)
 Barbazan-Debat (65062)
 Barbazan-Dessus (65063)
 Barry (65067)
 Barthe (65068)
 Bazet (65072)
 Bazillac (65073)
 Bazordan (65074)
 Bégole (65079)
 Bénac (65080)
 Bernac-Debat (65083)
 Bernac-Dessus (65084)
 Bernadets-Debat (65085)
 Bernadets-Dessus (65086)
 Betbèze (65088)
 Betpouy (65090)
 Bonnefont (65095)
 Bordères-sur-l'Échez (65100)
 Bordes (65101)
 Bouilh-Devant (65102)
 Bouilh-Péreuilh (65103)
 Boulin (65104)
 Bours (65108)
 Bugard (65110)
 Burg (65113)
 Buzon (65114)
 Cabanac (65115)
 Caharet (65118)
 Caixon (65119)
 Calavanté (65120)
 Camalès (65121)
 Campuzan (65126)
 Castelnau-Magnoac (65129)
 Castelnau-Rivière-Basse (65130)
 Castelvieilh (65131)
 Castéra-Lanusse (65132)
 Castéra-Lou (65133)
 Casterets (65134)
 Caubous (65136)
 Caussade-Rivière (65137)
 Chelle-Debat (65142)
 Chis (65146)
 Cizos (65148)
 Clarac (65149)
 Collongues (65151)
 Coussan (65153)
 Devèze (65155)
 Dours (65156)
 Escaunets (65160)
 Escondeaux (65161)
 Estampures (65170)
 Estirac (65174)
 Fontrailles (65177)
 Fréchède (65178)
 Fréchou-Fréchet (65181)
 Gardères (65185)
 Gaussan (65187)
 Gayan (65189)
 Gensac (65196)
 Gonez (65204)
 Goudon (65206)
 Guizerix (65213)
 Hachan (65214)
 Hagedet (65215)
 Hères (65219)
 Hibarette (65220)
 Hitte (65222)
 Horgues (65223)
 Hourc (65225)
 Ibos (65226)
 Jacque (65232)
 Juillan (65235)
 Labatut-Rivière (65240)
 Lacassagne (65242)
 Lafitole (65243)
 Lagarde (65244)
 Lahitte-Toupière (65248)
 Lalanne (65249)
 Lalanne-Trie (65250)
 Laloubère (65251)
 Lamarque-Pontacq (65252)
 Lamarque-Rustaing (65253)
 Laméac (65254)
 Lanespède (65256)
 Lanne (65257)
 Lansac (65259)
 Lapeyre (65260)
 Laran (65261)
 Larreule (65262)
 Larroque (65263)
 Lascazères (65264)
 Laslades (65265)
 Lassales (65266)
 Layrisse (65268)
 Lescurry (65269)
 Lespouey (65270)
 Lhez (65272)
 Liac (65273)
 Lizos (65276)
 Loucrup (65281)
 Louey (65284)
 Louit (65285)
 Lubret-Saint-Luc (65288)
 Luby-Betmont (65289)
 Luc (65290)
 Luquet (65292)
 Lustar (65293)
 Madiran (65296)
 Mansan (65297)
 Marquerie (65298)
 Marsac (65299)
 Marseillan (65301)
 Mascaras (65303)
 Maubourguet (65304)
 Mazerolles (65308)
 Mingot (65311)
 Momères (65313)
 Montfaucon (65314)
 Monléon-Magnoac (65315)
 Monlong (65316)
 Montignac (65321)
 Moulédous (65324)
 Moumoulous (65325)
 Mun (65326)
 Nouilhan (65330)
 Odos (65331)
 Oléac-Debat (65332)
 Oléac-Dessus (65333)
 Organ (65336)
 Orieux (65337)
 Orincles (65339)
 Orleix (65340)
 Oroix (65341)
 Osmets (65342)
 Ossun (65344)
 Oueilloux (65346)
 Oursbelille (65350)
 Ozon (65353)
 Peyraube (65357)
 Peyret-Saint-André (65358)
 Peyriguère (65359)
 Peyrun (65361)
 Pintac (65364)
 Poumarous (65367)
 Pouy (65368)
 Pouyastruc (65369)
 Pujo (65372)
 Puntous (65373)
 Puydarrieux (65374)
 Rabastens-de-Bigorre (65375)
 Ricaud (65378)
 Sabalos (65380)
 Sadournin (65383)
 Saint-Lanne (65387)
 Saint-Lézer (65390)
 Saint-Martin (65392)
 Saint-Sever-de-Rustan (65397)
 Salles-Adour (65401)
 Sanous (65403)
 Sariac-Magnoac (65404)
 Sarniguet (65406)
 Sarriac-Bigorre (65409)
 Sarrouilles (65410)
 Sauveterre (65412)
 Ségalas (65414)
 Séméac (65417)
 Sénac (65418)
 Sère-Rustaing (65423)
 Séron (65422)
 Siarrouy (65425)
 Sinzos (65426)
 Sombrun (65429)
 Soréac (65430)
 Soublecause (65432)
 Soues (65433)
 Souyeaux (65436)
 Talazac (65438)
 Tarasteix (65439)
 Tarbes (65440)
 Thermes-Magnoac (65442)
 Thuy (65443)
 Tostat (65446)
 Tournay (65447)
 Tournous-Darré (65448)
 Trie-sur-Baïse (65452)
 Trouley-Labarthe (65454)
 Ugnouas (65457)
 Vic-en-Bigorre (65460)
 Vidou (65461)
 Vidouze (65462)
 Vielle-Adour (65464)
 Vieuzos (65468)
 Villefranque (65472)
 Villembits (65474)
 Villemur (65475)
 Villenave-près-Béarn (65476)
 Villenave-près-Marsac (65477)
 Visker (65479)

History

The arrondissement of Tarbes was created in 1800. In January 2017 it lost 13 communes to the arrondissement of Bagnères-de-Bigorre.

As a result of the reorganisation of the cantons of France which came into effect in 2015, the borders of the cantons are no longer related to the borders of the arrondissements. The cantons of the arrondissement of Tarbes were, as of January 2015:

 Aureilhan
 Bordères-sur-l'Échez
 Castelnau-Magnoac
 Castelnau-Rivière-Basse
 Galan
 Laloubère
 Maubourguet
 Ossun
 Pouyastruc
 Rabastens-de-Bigorre
 Séméac
 Tarbes-1
 Tarbes-2
 Tarbes-3
 Tarbes-4
 Tarbes-5
 Tournay
 Trie-sur-Baïse
 Vic-en-Bigorre

References

Tarbes